Sujapur may refer to:
Sujapur, Malda
Sujapur, Punjab

 Sujapur (Vidhan Sabha constituency), an assembly constituency in Malda district in the Indian state of West Bengal